Rock Dancer is a 1995 Hindi drama film directed by Memon Roy and featured Govinda, Kamal Sadanah Shammi Kapoor and Javed Jaffrey as lead characters.

Plot
A passionate Jaya wants to build a charitable hospital for the poor people. But her dance career is finished due to their enemy. Jaya's sister Ritu is eager to fulfill her task. Ritu's boyfriend Rocky helps her to make her a Rockdancer.

Cast
Rajveer Randhawa
Kamal Sadanah
Javed Jaffrey
Shammi Kapoor
Ronit Roy as Rakesh
Ritu Shivpuri as Ritu
Samantha Fox
Sudhir

Soundtrack
"Lounda Badnaam Hua Laundiya Tere Liye" - Kavita Krishnamurthy, Bappi Lahiri
"Sa Re Ga Ma Pe Dha Ni" - Vijay Benedict, Alka Yagnik
"9 O Clock Ham Phone Karenge" - Parvati Khan, Bali Brahmbhatt
"Liya Liya Re Dil Usne Liya Re" (Woh Thi Hum The Kasam Se) - Usha Uthup, Kumar Sanu, Anoop Kumar
"One Two Cha Cha" - Kumar Sanu, Sharon Prabhakar
"Rock Is Love" - Bappi Lahiri
"Traffic Jam Sorry Traffic Jam" - Bappi Lahiri
"You Are My Chicken Fry" - Bappi Lahiri, Shweta Shetty
"Zindagi Dance Hai Dance Hai Jindagi" - Reema Lahiri
"Ek Room Ek Light" (Dil Bole Koi Aye Aye) (CD version) - Bappi Lahiri, Alka Yagnik
"Ek Room Ek Light" (Dil Bole Koi Aye Aye) (Movie version) - Vijay Benedict, Alka Yagnik

References

External links
 

1995 films
Films scored by Bappi Lahiri
1990s Hindi-language films
Indian dance films
Indian drama films